Petrovsky is a rural locality (a khutor) in Alexandrovsky Selsoviet, Meleuzovsky District, Bashkortostan, Russia. The population was 14 as of 2010. There are 2 streets.

Geography 
Petrovsky is located 41 km northeast of Meleuz (the district's administrative centre) by road. Khlebodarovka is the nearest rural locality.

References 

Rural localities in Meleuzovsky District